John William Henry Brown (April 22, 1893 – November 2, 1973) was a Canadian professional ice hockey player at the right wing position. He played with the Toronto Shamrocks, the Toronto Blueshirts, and the Toronto 228th Battalion of the National Hockey Association between 1914–1917.

References

1893 births
1973 deaths
Canadian ice hockey players
Ice hockey people from Ontario
People from Northumberland County, Ontario
Toronto 228th Battalion players
Toronto Blueshirts players
Toronto Shamrocks players